Longbush may refer to:

Longbush, Southland, New Zealand
Longbush, Wellington, New Zealand